Alycia Pirmohamed is a Canadian-born poet living in Scotland. She has published two poetry pamphlets, Faces that Fled the Wind and Hinge. Pirmohamed has won multiple awards for her poetry, including the CBC Literary Prize for poetry in 2019 and the Edwin Morgan Poetry Award in 2020.

Biography
Alycia Pirmohamed was born and raised in Alberta, Canada. She obtained an MFA from the University of Oregon and later completed a PhD at the University of Edinburgh, where she studied the poetry of second generation immigrant writers. Faces that Fled the Wind, Pirmohamed's first poetry pamphlet, was published by BOAAT Press in 2019. The pamphlet was selected for the BOAAT  Chapbook Prize in 2018. She was also the recipient of the Ploughshares Emerging Writers’ Contest in Poetry in 2018.

In 2019, Pirmohamed was awarded the CBC poetry prize, with her poem, Love Poem with Elk and Punctuation, Prairie Storm and Tasbih. She was awarded $6,000 (CAD) from the Canada Council for the Arts and a writing residency at the Banff Centre for Arts and Creativity.  Pirmohamed won additional poetry prizes in 2019, including the 92Y Discovery Poetry prize, the Sawti Poetry Prize and the Gulf Coast poetry prize.

In 2020, Pirmohamed was named the winner of the Edwin Morgan Poetry Award for the best unpublished poetry collection by a Scottish poet under the age of 30. Her pamphlet, Hinge, was later published by Ignition Press in 2020. The £20,000 poetry prize is one of the largest in the UK. Pirmohamed's first full poetry collection, Another Way to Split Water, was published Sept 2, 2022.

Pirmohamed is co-founder of the Scottish BAME Writers Network (SBWN). The organization, founded in 2018 by Pirmohamed and Jay Gao, "is an advocacy and professional development group for writers who identify as BAME (Black, Asian, minority ethnic), mixed-race or POC (people of colour) with a connection to Scotland."

Selected publications
 Faces that Fled the Wind (BOAAT Press 2019), pamphlet
 Hinge (ignitionpress, 2020), pamphlet
 Another Way to Split Water (2022), poetry collection

Awards and recognition
 The BOAAT Press Chapbook Prize (2018), Faces that Fled the Wind, pamphlet
  Ploughshares Emerging Writers’ Contest in Poetry (2018),  Elegy for My Mother's Sister, Ways of Looking, Belief as an Ocean Landscape, and No Homeland Ghazal, poems
 92Y Discovery Poetry winner (2019), There Are Parts of Myself I Have Watched Die, poem
 The CBC Literary Prize for poetry, (2019), Love Poem with Elk and Punctuation, Prairie Storm and Tasbih, poem
 The Sawti Poetry Prize (2019), Self-Portrait as a Lost Language, poem
 The Gulf Coast Prize in Poetry, (2019), Hinge, pamphlet
 The Edwin Morgan Poetry Prize (2020), Hinge, pamphlet
 The Poetry Book Society pamphlet Choice (2020), Hinge'', pamphlet

References

Writers from Edmonton
Scottish people
21st-century Canadian poets
Canadian women poets
Living people
Alumni of the University of Edinburgh
University of Oregon alumni
Year of birth missing (living people)